A global warming game, also known as a climate game or a climate change game, is a type of serious game. As a serious game, it attempts to simulate and explore real life issues to educate players through an interactive experience. The issues particular to a global warming video game are usually energy efficiency and the implementation of green technology as ways to reduce greenhouse gas emissions and thus counteract global warming. Global warming games include traditional board games, video games, and other varieties such as role-playing and simulation-assisted multiplayer games.

Objectives 
The primary objectives of global warming games are threefold:

To develop the player's familiarity and knowledge of the issue of global warming and related issues
To make the player aware of the challenges and obstacles that are faced when addressing global warming
Occasionally, the games encourage players to develop ideas and solutions to global warming

The first objective is universal to global warming games. The issues surrounding global warming commonly included are  emissions and the emission of other greenhouse gases, the melting of the polar ice caps, sea-level rise, natural disasters and massive changes to lifestyles caused by global warming. Games that do not go beyond the objective of knowledge and familiarity tend to be designed for younger audiences. Games designed for young children often only have the goal to engage the children enough to excite their attention to focus on these basic concepts.

The second objective is integrated into games in a variety of ways. Sometimes demonstrating the challenges of confronting global warming are put directly into the style of gameplay, e.g. to demonstrate the difficulty of international cooperation, players are made to represent different countries and are required to negotiate to fulfill game objectives. Other times, the game includes the challenges as a part of the mechanics, e.g. building 'green factories' is more expensive than building 'black factories.'

The final objective is shared by the most interactive and engaging global warming games. Developing solutions to global warming includes two major types of response: mitigation of emissions and global warming's effects, and adaptation to live sustainably in a new climate. Typically players are given a variety of different options so that they may come up with a number of different creative solutions. Sometimes players are even allowed freedom to create their own unique options to integrate into their strategy.

Notable examples

Climate-game (original) 
Climate-game is a board-game trying to achieve all the above three objectives. Climate-game is a gamified version of some of the most respected climate simulation models developed En-Roads. The relatively simple dynamic modelled on the board were tuned to be in line with the behaviour of the professional climate simulation models and allows players to benchmark their efforts on a global temperature increase vs. time graph to some highlighted scenarios such as 'Business as Usual' +4.1C or a sample Paris goal. 
The players start the game by setting the initial conditions similar to the actual climate conditions and begin applying a series of social and technological changes in their societies. After each turn, the quizmaster (the planet master) took the climate physic in action and modify the planetary parameters followed by simple rules. At the end of the 20th turn, the game ends at a hypothetical version of the planet in 2100. Players have the chance to play various utopias and check where those yield in 2100.

LogiCity 
LogiCity was an interactive Flash-based virtual-reality based computer game, produced by Logicom and The National Energy Foundation, an English charity. The game is set in a 3D virtual city with five main activities where players are set the task of reducing the carbon footprint of an average resident.  The activities comprise:
 a race against time around a virtual reality office switching off equipment left on by careless users;
 finding and selecting energy efficiency and renewable energy options in a home, but with a strictly limited budget;
 answering a quiz about features they have to find in a low energy building;
 taking part in a role playing game to select the best travel options for three generations of a family; and
 choosing a holiday from a virtual travel agent - but with the risk that climate change may have led to unexpected changes at the destination.

As players work their way through the game they attempt to cut their carbon footprint from a typical English figure of 5.5 tonnes to a level of 2.0 tonnes.  At the end of the game they are taken forward to 2066 to see if they have done enough to save England from the worst problems associated with global climate change.  The game's conclusion and focus on 2066 is designed to bring home to players the reality of the changes they may face in their lifetime.

The game was created as part of Defra's (Department for Environment, Food and Rural Affairs) Climate Challenge programme to increase public awareness of Climate Change across the country.  The National Energy Foundation, Logicom and British Gas also provided support to the game's development. LogiCity is designed to be used both by individuals and in an educational context. It is stated to be suitable for most children from the ages of 10 or 11 upward (English KS3+), although the main target group is young adults aged 16–26.

The game could either be played online or distributed across a network from a CD-ROM.  There are no licensing implications as it has been publicly funded, although all PCs being used for the game do need to meet certain technical requirements (notably being PCs not Macs, and using Internet Explorer as a browser), and may require additional software plug-ins to be downloaded (a VRML viewer and a recent version of Flash player).

There has been some criticism that the game is only really applicable to England, due to limitations imposed by its funders, so that it is unlikely to appeal widely in North America.  The look and feel of the game concentrates on a near photo-realism for buildings, but the player is disembodied and lacks an avatar. Firefox users are unable to run the game unless they switch to Internet Explorer, and some users have commented that download times for each module can be up to a minute, although this may be overcome by using the CD-ROM implementation. Logicity was also made available via a cover disk on PC Gamer magazine.

Stabilization Wedge Game 

The Stabilization Wedge Game, or what is commonly referred to as simply the 'Wedge Game', is a serious game produced by Princeton University's Carbon Mitigation Initiative. The goal of the game creators, Stephen W. Pacala and Robert H. Socolow, is to demonstrate through this game that global warming is a problem which can be solved by implementing today's technologies to reduce  emissions. The object of the game is to keep the next fifty years of  emissions flat, using seven wedges from a variety of different strategies which fit into the stabilization triangle.

Climate Challenge 

Climate Challenge is an environmental serious game, designed to give players an understanding of the science behind climate change, as well as the options available to policy makers and the difficulties in their implementation.

The Climate Change Game 
The Climate Change Game is played by one or two people (sharing the Mouse). Each player is the leader of a country, hoping to be re-elected while trying to cope with the effects of climate change and, hopefully, reverse it.
Players make Decisions to change the energy sources their countries use or use them in a different way. Players also answer Questions on Climate Change and respond to Natural Events (such as volcanic eruptions) which affect Climate, People's Choices (unpredictable, popular human actions which impact Greenhouse Gas emissions and tax revenues), and economic or political decisions by other countries that affect the level of greenhouse gas emissions.
Players win “The Climate Change Game” – and are re-elected - if they can help reduce global Greenhouse Gas emissions to the level required by the Kyoto Protocol, and are not spending more money than people pay in taxes, and maintain Voter Support of at least 51 percent, and Earth's Temperature is “comfortable" for life.

V GAS 

V GAS is a 3D serious game in which players explore and live in a house that is built to mirror their own. Players begin the game by building a profile including variables such as water use and transportation behaviors, heating and cooling practices, food purchases, and electrical appliance usage. Once the profile has been built, the player can begin the simulation which introduces different scenarios ranging from heat waves to mad cow disease. The player adjusts their lifestyle according to how they would react to these events in real life. All the while, the players' decisions are being measured and recorded, and their overall contribution to N2O, and CH4 to the atmosphere is measured.

Keep Cool 

Keep Cool is a board game created by Klaus Eisenack and Gerhard Petschel-Held of the Potsdam Institute for Climate Impact Research and published by the German company Spieltrieb in November 2004. The game can be classified as both a serious game and a global warming game. In Keep Cool, up to six players representing the world's countries compete to balance their own economic interests and the world's climate in a game of negotiation. The goal of the game as stated by the authors is to "promote the general knowledge on climate change and the understanding of difficulties and obstacles, and "to make it available for a board game and still retain the major elements and processes." A quantitative-empirical study with more than 200 students shows that Keep Cool facilitates experimental learning about climate change and helps "to develop individual beliefs about sustainable development by experiencing complex system dynamics that are not tangible in everyday life."

Winds of Change 
The European Climate Forum and Munich Re have launched a climate game called Winds of Change, which is a board game for 2-4 persons. The game illustrates the climate challenge in a playful way and it can be used in team learning, schools, focus groups, etc. It includes several features, which are hotly debated in climate policy-making.

Climate-Poker 
Berlin-based Andrea Meyer, game designer with an environmental background published this card game in her company BeWitched-Spiele in 2009. Playing the card game for 2-4 persons ages 12 and up takes 30–40 minutes. The game has players collect groups of like-minded countries in order to hold conferences. The bigger the conference the better. Country cards show indicators on -emissions per capita as well as figures on consequences of extreme weather events (deaths and damages). While no knowledge is needed to play the game, players will learn a bit about who is causing climate change and who is suffering from it. On the game side, Climate-Poker requires bluffing and closely watching what the other players are aiming at. the 2 degrees limit, and insurance against. The figures in the game stem from the World Resources Institutes' Climate Analysis Indicators Tool (CAIT) and from Munich Re.

CEO2 - Climate Business Game 
The online climate game CEO2 from World Wide Fund for Nature and Allianz is a rather complex simulation that allows one player to run a company over a period of 20 years. Players can choose from four industries (automobile, chemicals, insurance, utility). They have a limited budget and can choose from a variety of business decision like investing in smart grids or carbon capture and storage (utility). Their target is to reduce  emissions significantly until 2030 without going bankrupt. Advisors (environmentalist, investors, researcher) offer help but their suggestions can be one-sided. The game is based on the RECIPE study from the Potsdam Institute for Climate Impact Research.

Fate of the World 

Fate of the World is a 2011 Microsoft Windows and Mac OS game developed and published by Red Redemption, the developers of Climate Challenge.  It focuses on global governance, with goals ranging from improving living conditions in Africa, to preventing catastrophic climate change, to exacerbating it.  It is based around an intricate model of populations, economic production and greenhouse emissions based on real-world data.

Plantville 
Plantville is "an innovative, educational and fun way for Siemens to engage customers, employees, prospects, students and the general public while driving awareness of Siemens technologies and brand." The game enables players to improve the health of their plants by learning about and applying industrial and infrastructure products and solutions from Siemens. Gamers will be measured on a number of Key Performance Indicators (KPIs), including safety, on time delivery, quality, energy management and employee satisfaction.

The Climate Trail 
The Climate Trail is a 2019 post climate apocalypse game based on the classic game The Oregon Trail.  Created by William Volk in Ren'Py and Python it is a free game for Mac, Linux, Windows, iOS and Android.  It combines visual novel elements with a journey from Atlanta to Canada along an abandoned highway.  Players obtain and ration supplies, deal with hazards, and lead a group of survivors.  In 2020 a climate e-book based on ClimateCommunication.org and quizzes were added.  The game has been featured on The Weather Channel and reviewed by GameIndustry.biz, Futurism, and GameFreaks.  The game was inspired by the short story "A Full Life" by Paolo Bacigalupi.

Carbon City Zero 
Carbon City Zero is a global warming game published by the climate action charity Possible in January 2021.The game is a collaborative deck-building card game for 1-4 people in which players take on the role of city mayors working to develop sustainable cities by greening transport, transforming industries, and getting their citizens on board. Since its release on Kickstarter, the game has been made available as a free print-and-play download via PnP Arcade and as an online game on Tabletopia.

Solutions 
Solutions is an upcoming board game about hope and action for the climate. As global temperatures increase, players must collaborate to play climate solutions and keep temperatures at or below 1.5 degrees Celsius. The game is based on Project Drawdown, the world's leading resource for climate solutions.

Xbox 360 Games for Change Challenge 
The Xbox 360 Games for Change Challenge is a collaborative effort between Microsoft and Games for Change (G4C), a subgroup of the Serious Games Initiative. The challenge is a worldwide competition to develop a global warming game with Microsoft's XNA Game Studio Express software. Winners will be awarded scholarships from Games for Change and Microsoft, and the winning games will have the possibility of being available for download on the Xbox Live Arcade service. The Xbox 360 Games for Change Challenge has been cast by Microsoft as a "socially-minded" initiative, joining the larger serious games movement. Suzanne Seggerman, a co-founder of Games for Change, shared these comments in a radio interview:

See also 

 Climate change in popular culture

References

External links
Carbon City Zero
Dynamic Climate Change Simulator

Environmental education video games
Climate change and society
Climate change by medium